Pheidole symbiotica is a species of ant in the genus Pheidole. It is endemic to Argentina.

References

symbiotica
Endemic fauna of Argentina
Hymenoptera of South America
Insects described in 1909
Vulnerable animals
Vulnerable biota of South America
Taxonomy articles created by Polbot